Anna Vladimirovna Dybo (born June 4, 1959) is a Russian linguist, member of the Russian Academy of Sciences, and co-author (with Sergei Starostin) of the Etymological Dictionary of the Altaic Languages (2003), which encompasses some 3,000 Proto-Altaic stems.

She is the daughter of Vladimir Dybo.

Works by Anna V. Dybo
2003. With Sergei A. Starostin and Oleg A. Mudrak. Etymological Dictionary of the Altaic Languages, 3 volumes. Leiden: Brill Academic Publishers. 
2005. "Dental explosives in Proto-Turkic" (in Russian). Aspects of Comparative Linguistics 1 (2005), 49-82.  Moscow: RSUH Publishers.
2007. "Reconstruction of Proto-Oguz Conjugation" (in Russian). Aspects of Comparative Linguistics 2 (2007), 259-280. Moscow: RSUH Publishers.
2008. With George S. Starostin. "In defense of the comparative method, or the end of the Vovin controversy." (Originally published in: Aspects of Comparative Linguistics 3 (2008), 109-258 (in Russian), Moscow: RSUH Publishers.)

References

1959 births
Living people
Linguists from Russia
Paleolinguists
Corresponding Members of the Russian Academy of Sciences
Linguists of Altaic languages
Women linguists